Norbert Eschmann (19 September 1933 – 13 May 2009) was a footballer who played as a midfielder. Born in France, he represented Switzerland at international level.

References

External links
  

1933 births
2009 deaths
Sportspeople from Besançon
Association football midfielders
Swiss men's footballers
French footballers
Switzerland international footballers
1954 FIFA World Cup players
1962 FIFA World Cup players
Ligue 1 players
Ligue 2 players
Swiss Super League players
FC Lausanne-Sport players
Red Star F.C. players
Servette FC players
Olympique de Marseille players
Stade Français (association football) players
FC Sion players
BSC Young Boys players
FC Locarno players
FC Martigny-Sports players
Swiss football managers
FC Locarno managers
FC Martigny-Sports managers
Footballers from Bourgogne-Franche-Comté